Charlotte Motor Speedway (previously known as Lowe's Motor Speedway from 1999 to 2009) is a motorsport complex located in Concord, North Carolina,  outside Charlotte. The complex features a  quad oval track that hosts NASCAR racing including the prestigious Coca-Cola 600 on Memorial Day weekend, and the Bank of America Roval 400. The speedway was built in 1959 by Bruton Smith and is considered the home track for NASCAR with many race teams located in the Charlotte area. The track is owned and operated by Speedway Motorsports with Greg Walter as track president.

The  complex also features a state-of-the-art  drag racing strip, ZMAX Dragway. It is the only all-concrete, four-lane drag strip in the United States and hosts NHRA events. Alongside the drag strip is a state-of-the-art clay oval that hosts dirt racing including the World of Outlaws finals among other popular racing events.

History 

Charlotte Motor Speedway was designed and built by Bruton Smith and partner and driver Curtis Turner in 1959. The first World 600 NASCAR race was held at the  speedway on June 19, 1960. On December 8, 1961, the speedway filed bankruptcy notice. Judge J. B. Craven of United States District Court for the Western District of North Carolina reorganized it under Chapter 10 of the Bankruptcy Act; Judge Craven appointed Robert "Red" Robinson as the track's trustee until March 1962. At that point, a committee of major stockholders in the speedway was assembled, headed by A. C. Goines and furniture store owner Richard Howard. Goines, Howard and Robinson worked to secure loans and other monies to keep the speedway afloat.

By April 1963 some $750,000 was paid to twenty secured creditors and the track emerged from bankruptcy; Judge Craven appointed Goines as speedway president and Howard as assistant general manager of the speedway, handling its day-to-day operations. By 1964 Howard become the track's general manager, and on June 1, 1967, the speedway's mortgage was paid in full; a public burning of the mortgage was held at the speedway two weeks later.

Smith departed from the speedway in 1962 to pursue other business interests, primarily in banking and auto dealerships from his new home of Rockford, Illinois. He became quite successful and began buying out shares of stock in the speedway. By 1974 Smith was more heavily involved in the speedway, to where Richard Howard by 1975 stated, "I haven't been running the speedway. It's being run from Illinois." In 1975 Smith had become the majority stockholder, regaining control of its day-to-day operations. Smith hired H. A. "Humpy" Wheeler as general manager in October 1975, and on January 29, 1976, Richard Howard resigned as president and GM of the speedway.

Together Smith and Wheeler began to implement plans for improvement and expansion of the speedway.

In the following years, new grandstands and luxury suites were added along with modernized concessions and restrooms to increase the comfort for race fans. The tower houses the speedway corporate offices, ticket office, gift shop, leased offices and The Speedway Club, an exclusive dining and entertainment facility. The speedway became the first sports facility in America to offer year round living accommodations when 40 condominia were built overlooking turn 1 in 1984, twelve additional condominium units were later added in 1991.

In 1992, Smith and Wheeler directed the installation of a $1.7 million, 1,200-fixture permanent lighting system around the track developed by Musco lighting. The track became the first modern superspeedway to host night racing, and was the largest lighted speedway until 1998 when lights were installed around the  Daytona International Speedway. In 1994, Smith and Wheeler added a new $1 million,  garage area to the speedway's infield.

In 1995, 26-year-old Russell Phillips was killed in one of the most gruesome crashes in auto racing history.

From 1997 to 1999 the track hosted the IndyCar Series. On lap 61 of the 1999 race, a crash led to a car losing a tire, which was then propelled into the grandstands by another car. Three spectators were killed and eight others were injured in the incident. The race was canceled shortly after, and the series has not returned to the track since. The incident, along with a similar incident in July 1998 in a Champ Car race at Michigan International Speedway, led to new rules requiring cars to have tethers attached to wheel hubs to prevent tires from breaking away in a crash.

In February 1999, Lowe's bought the naming rights to the speedway, making it the first race track in the country with a corporate sponsor. Lowe's chose not to renew its naming rights after the 2009 NASCAR season. The track reverted to its original name, Charlotte Motor Speedway, in 2010.

In 2005, the surface of the track had begun to wear since its last repaving in 1994. This resulted in track officials diamond-grinding the track, a process known as levigation, to smooth out bumps that had developed. The ground surface caused considerable tire-wear problems in both of the NASCAR races that year. Both races saw a high number of accidents as a result of tire failure due to the roughness of the surface. In 2006, the track was completely repaved.

Track president "Humpy" Wheeler retired following the Coca-Cola 600 on May 25, 2008, and was replaced by Marcus Smith. At the end of 2008, the speedway reduced capacity by 25,000 citing reduced ticket sales. At the same time, the front stretch seats were upgraded from  fold down seats to  stadium style seats that were acquired from the recently demolished Charlotte Coliseum.
On September 22, 2010, the speedway announced a partnership with Panasonic to install the world's largest high definition video board at the track. It has since been surpassed in size by the video board at Texas Motor Speedway. The track demolished the Diamond Tower Terrace grandstand on the backstretch in 2014 to reduce the track's seating capacity to 89,000. Charlotte Motor Speedway reduced their seating capacity by 31% due to the continuing declining attendance. This downfall of attendance has not only been felt at Charlotte Motor Speedway, but all throughout NASCAR, thus causing Daytona International Speedway to go through renovations, also reducing seating.

Grandstand fatalities 

On Saturday night, May 1, 1999, at the VisionAire 500K Indy Racing League race, as reported by IRL announcer Mike King, grandstands in the apex of Turn 1 were closed, but seats in Turns 1 and 2 past the apex were open.  Seats outside of Turn 4 were also closed. When attendance grew beyond the 50,000 expected for the race, extra sections of stands were opened, and one of them was the section of track where the debris flew in Turn 4. Buddy Lazier was leading the race at the time of the caution for the Lap 62 crash involving Stan Wattles and John Paul Jr. when Wattles’ rear suspension failed, with the right rear wheel assembly hit by Paul, launching it into the grandstands. After pit stops, Greg Ray was leading the race when the race was abandoned. The race was canceled after 79 laps, and the IRL did not return.

Aftermath 

That incident, and a previous incident in July 1998 in a Champ Car race at Michigan which also killed three spectators (that race was run to its finish), led to new rules requiring cars to have tethers attached to wheel hubs in an effort to prevent such incidents from happening again. New catch fencing was also invented, curved so debris could not sail as easily into the grandstands.

Bridge collapse 

On May 20, 2000, fans were crossing a pedestrian bridge from the track to a nearby parking lot after that year's The Winston (NASCAR's all-star race). An  section of the walkway fell onto a highway in Concord. In total, 107 fans were injured at Lowe's Motor Speedway when the bridge dropped  to the ground. Nearly 50 lawsuits against the speedway resulted from the incident, with many being settled out of court. Investigators have said the bridge builder, Tindall Corp., used an improper additive to help the concrete filler at the bridge's center cure faster. The additive contained calcium chloride, which corroded the structure's steel cables and led to the collapse. The incident is considered one of the biggest disasters in NASCAR history.

Layouts

Quad oval 

Currently, the configuration hosts the NASCAR Cup Series (NASCAR All-Star Race and Coca-Cola 600), Xfinity Series (Alsco Uniforms 300), and Truck Series (North Carolina Education Lottery 200).

Short oval 
Inside the front stretch is a  flat oval designed after Bowman-Gray Stadium. The 1/4-mile track previously hosted the NASCAR Whelen Southern Modified Tour. Now it currently hosts the Summer Shootout Series and other events such as the Legends Million.

Road course / "Roval" 

Contained within the main oval is a  road course and a  Kart course. The autumn races for both the NASCAR Cup Series and the NASCAR Xfinity Series take place on the road course, promoted as a "Roval". The final version was announced on January 22, 2018. The layout combines the  oval with the infield road-racing section over 17 turns. The redesign requires heavier braking and a sharper entry, but allows better passing opportunities. AJ Allmendinger has 4 straight wins on the Charlotte road course in the Xfinity Series, from 2019 to 2022.

zMAX Dragway 

It was built in 2008 involving a total of 1,876 workers and a combined 636,000 man hours. With 300 workers on site daily working an average 11-hour shift, a 13-month construction project turned into a 6-month one. At one point during construction, concern by nearby residents led Concord city council to rezone land the drag strip was being built on, preventing it from being built. Following the decision Smith threatened to close Charlotte Motor Speedway and build a track elsewhere in Metrolina. When asked if he would go through with the threat Smith replied "I am deadly serious". After a month of negotiations, the issue was settled and, instead of the speedway closing, Smith announced $200 million worth of improvements including road and highway improvements, as well as noise attenuation for the drag strip. The drag strip officially opened on August 20, 2008, and a public open house was held a few days later. The first NHRA event was held September 11–14, 2008.

The dragway features the first of two all-concrete, four-lane drag strips in the United States. (The track was the only four-lane track of its kind from 2008 until the spring of 2018, when renovations were completed at Las Vegas Motor Speedway, converting its dragstrip into a four-lane configuration.) Two grandstands, one on either side of the strip, can hold a combined 30,000 spectators. Twenty-four luxury suites with hospitality accommodations are located above the main grandstand. Two tunnels run underneath the strip to enhance fan mobility between the two grandstands.

The Dirt Track 
The Dirt Track at Charlotte is a  clay oval located across Highway 29 from the quad-oval speedway. The stadium-style facility, built in 2000, has nearly 14,000 seats and plays host to Dirt Late Models, Modifieds, Sprint Cars, Monster Trucks and the prestigious World of Outlaws World Finals. In 2013, the track hosted the Global Rallycross Round 8.

Events

Current races 

NASCAR Cup Series:
Coca-Cola 600 (1960–present)
Bank of America Roval 400 (1960–present)
NASCAR Xfinity Series:
Alsco Uniforms 300 (1978–present)
Drive for the Cure 250 (1973–present)
NASCAR Camping World Truck Series:
North Carolina Education Lottery 200 (2003–present)
ARCA Menards Series
General Tire 150 (1996–2004, 2018–2019, 2021–present)
NHRA Camping World Drag Racing Series
Circle K 4 Wide Nationals
Betway Nationals
World of Outlaws
Circle K/NOS Energy Drink Outlaw Showdown (NOS Energy Drink Sprint Cars)
Bad Boy Off Road World Finals (NOS Energy Drink Sprint Cars, Morton Buildings Late Models, Super DIRTcar Series)
INEX raceCeiver Legends Car Series/Bandoleros
Bojangles Summer Shootout Series
Winter Heat Series
INEX Bandolero Nationals (2015, 2018)
ChampCar Endurance Series
14-Hours of Charlotte

Former races 
AMA Superbike Championship (1977, 1980, 1991–1993)
American Le Mans Series
Grand Prix of Charlotte (2000)
American Flat Track
Don Tilley Memorial Charlotte Half-Mile (2015–2017)
ASA National Tour
Aaron's 99 (2004) - won by Reed Sorenson
Can-Am (1978–1979)
Champ Truck World Series (2015)
Fastrak Racing Series (2006–2010)
IMSA GT Championship
Grand Prix of Charlotte (1971, 1974, 1982–1986)
IMSA SportsCar Championship
Grand Prix of Charlotte (2020)
INEX raceCeiver Legends Car Series/Bandoleros
Legends All Star (2010–2013, 2015)
Legend Car Dirt Nationals (2001)
IROC (1996–1997)
NASCAR Goody's Dash Series/IPOWER Dash Series (1975–1976, 1985–1988, 1997–2004)
Lucas Oil Late Model Dirt Series (2005–2006)
Monster Energy AMA Supercross (1996–1998)
MXGP
MXGP of Americas (2016)
Mystik Lubricant's Terracross Championship (2014)
NASCAR K&N Pro Series East 
All-Pro Auto Parts 300 (1987) – combination race with the NASCAR Xfinity Series, won by Harry Gant
NASCAR Whelen Modified Tour
Southern Slam 150 (2017) - won by Doug Coby
NASCAR Sportsman Division (1989–1995)
NASCAR Whelen Southern Modified Tour
Southern Slam 150 (2010-2016, became a Whelen Modified Tour non-points event after the demise of the Southern Modified Tour)
National Dirt Racing Association
Crate Late Models (2010–2013)
Modz Series (2011)
Pirelli World Challenge (2000, 2007)
Red Bull Global Rallycross (2012–2014)
SCCA Formula Super Vee (1974, 1978–1982)
Stadium Super Trucks (2016)
Super DIRTcar Series
Eckerd 100 (2001–2005)
Trans-Am Series (1981, 2000, 2022)
TORC: The Off Road Championship
Showdown in Charlotte (2014, 2016)
USAC
AMSOIL National Sprint Cars (2003–2005) – Dirt Track
Honda National Midget Championship (1998) – Quarter Mile
Indy Racing League
VisionAire 500K (1997–1999)
World of Outlaws Late Model Series
WoO LM October Showdown

Other events 
The facility is considered one of the busiest sports venues in the country, typically with over 380 events a year. Along with many races, the speedway also hosts the Charlotte Auto Fair twice a year, one of the nation's largest car shows. Movies and commercials have been filmed at the speedway, notably Days of Thunder, and it is a popular tourist stop and car testing grounds. The facility also hosts several driving schools year-round, such as Richard Petty Driving Experience, where visitors have the opportunity to experience the speedway from a unique point-of-view behind the wheel of a race car.

The feature of the April 2005 Food Lion Auto Fair at the speedway was a popular sculpture exhibition, Jim Gary's Twentieth Century Dinosaurs. It is a menagerie of Garysauruses, all life-sized, and constructed of automobile parts. A special tent housed the heavily attended exhibition and a huge Gary sculpture, over forty feet long, was displayed at the entrance to the raceway during the entire fair. H. A. "Humpy" Wheeler and the speedway then sponsored the funding for the traveling sculpture exhibition to be featured by Belk College of Business on the campus of the University of North Carolina at Charlotte where a self-guided tour of the campus-wide display was extended to the end of July.

In 2006 the speedway hosted the world premiere of Pixar's 2006 film Cars.

American Idol season twelve auditions took place at the speedway from October 2–3, 2012.

Since 2013, the annual Carolina Rebellion hard rock and heavy metal festival concert on the first weekend in May has been held at the Rock City Campgrounds located at the speedway. Bands such as Avenged Sevenfold, Kid Rock, Deftones, Disturbed, ZZ Top, Halestorm, Sevendust, Anthrax. Five Finger Death Punch, and All That Remains have played at Carolina Rebellion. The event was extended to three-day format in 2016, with 80,000 in attendance.

Proposed football stadium
During the mid-1980s, there was a plan to build a football stadium on the frontstretch of the track with the goal of luring either an NFL or USFL team. The stadium would have held 76,000 and had temporary stands at both endzones and grandstand seating behind pitroad that could have been lowered on hydraulic lifts for races and cost $12 million. There were two interested parties in bringing a professional football franchise to Charlotte, businessman George Shinn and Smith. By 1984, Shinn was in the running for a USFL franchise for Charlotte that would have played in the proposed stadium. In mid-March 1985, Bruton Smith announced that Charlotte Motor Speedway was in the market for an NFL team. After Smith demanded that the city of Charlotte pay for the project the plan collapsed. Shinn eventually landed the NBA Charlotte Hornets and the NFL came to town in the form of the Carolina Panthers; however, the Panthers owner Jerry Richardson would go on to build his own stadium in Charlotte.

Lap records 
The official race lap records at Charlotte Motor Speedway are listed as:

Track records 

NOTE: The track records listed for Top Fuel and Funny Car are in the 1,000 foot (304.8 meter) increment.

Notes

References

External links

Official site
Map and circuit history at RacingCircuits.info

Charlotte Motor Speedway Page on NASCAR.com
Jayski's Charlotte Motor Speedway Page – Current and past Charlotte Motor Speedway Speedway news
Richard Petty Driving Experience at Charlotte Motor Speedway

Motorsport venues in North Carolina
IndyCar Series tracks
Concord, North Carolina
NHRA Division 2 drag racing venues
NASCAR races at Charlotte Motor Speedway
American Le Mans Series circuits
IMSA GT Championship circuits
Sports venues in Cabarrus County, North Carolina
Tourist attractions in Cabarrus County, North Carolina
Off-road racing venues in the United States
Sports venues completed in 1960
1960 establishments in North Carolina
NASCAR tracks
ARCA Menards Series tracks
Road courses in the United States